The little green pigeon (Treron olax) is a species of bird in the family Columbidae. It is found in Brunei, Indonesia, Malaysia, Singapore, and Thailand. Its natural habitat is subtropical or tropical moist lowland forests. It is smaller than other species in the genus Treron.

Like other green pigeons they are frugivorous and found in forested habitats.

References

little green pigeon
Birds of Malesia
little green pigeon
Taxonomy articles created by Polbot